Dr. Hala is a Lebanese television series produced in 2009 by Marwa Group. The series was written by Claudia Marchalian.

Plot
Hala (Rita Barsona) had bad emotional experiences in her youth. As an adult, she ignored love to focus on study and work, until she met the journalist Ghadi (Peter Semaan), with whom she fell in love. However, after a former lover Nadeem (Muhammad Ibrahim) returns, Hala lives in a struggle between the past, present and future.

Cast 
 Rita Barsona - Hala
 Peter Semaan - Ghadi
 Muhammad Ibrahim - Nadeem
 Youssef Haddad
 Aline Lahoud
 Omar Mikati
 Toni Nseir
 Nada Remi
 Gilles Youssef
 Tarek Yaacoub (Leon)

References

External links 

Official website

Lebanese television soap operas
2000s Lebanese television series
MTV (Lebanon) original programming